Cutandia is a genus of Asian and Mediterranean plants in the grass family. It is native to lands extending from Portugal and Cape Verde to Pakistan and Kazakhstan.

 Species
 Cutandia dichotoma (Forssk.) Trab. - Asia + Africa from Algeria to Iran
 Cutandia divaricata (Desf.) Benth.  - Canary Islands, Spain, Italy (incl Sicily + Sardinia), Morocco, Algeria, Tunisia, Libya
 Cutandia maritima (L.) Benth. - Mediterranean, Canary Islands
 Cutandia memphitica (Spreng.) Benth. - Spain, North Africa, Canary Islands, Cape Verde, Middle East, Caucasus, Arabian Peninsula, Iran, Pakistan, Afghanistan, Central Asia
 Cutandia rigescens (Grossh.) Tzvelev - Caucasus, iran, Kazakhstan, Uzbekistan
 Cutandia stenostachya (Boiss.) Stace - Greece + Turkey including Aegean Islands

 formerly included
see Desmazeria Vulpiella 
 Cutandia incrassata - Vulpiella stipoides  
 Cutandia philistaea - Desmazeria philistaea  
 Cutandia rohlfsiana - Desmazeria philistaea

References

Pooideae
Poaceae genera